Le Soliat is a mountain of the Jura, overlooking Lake Neuchâtel in western Switzerland. The main summit (1,465 m) is located within the canton of Neuchâtel. A secondary summit (1,463 m) is located within the canton of Vaud.

The north side of the mountain forms a rocky cirque named Creux du Van.

See also
List of most isolated mountains of Switzerland

References

External links
Le Soliat on Hikr

Mountains of the Jura
Mountains of the canton of Neuchâtel
Mountains of Switzerland
One-thousanders of Switzerland